Symphyotrichum puniceum (formerly Aster puniceus), is a species of flowering plant in the family Asteraceae native to eastern North America. It is commonly known as purplestem aster, red-stalk aster, red-stemmed aster, red-stem aster, and swamp aster. It also has been called early purple aster, cocash, swanweed, and  meadow scabish.

Its range extends from the edges of the Great Plains to the Atlantic coast, and from the Gulf coast of Texas north to southern Ungava Bay in the north of Quebec. It is adventive in Europe.

Description
Symphyotrichum puniceum produces flowers between August and October. The ray florets range from dark blue or purple to white (rarely). The disc florets are yellow to cream-colored, becoming pink or purple with maturity.

Taxonomy
Symphyotrichum puniceum is a variable species, and many forms have been named. ,  Plants of the World Online (POWO) accepts one variety in addition to the autonym. S. puniceum var. scabricaule (Shinners) G.L.Nesom occurs in the southern United States from Texas to Alabama. The autonym, S. puniceum var. puniceum, occurs in most of the eastern United States and southern Canada.

The species Symphyotrichum firmum is sometimes considered a variety of S. puniceum, but POWO and Flora of North America treat them as distinct species. In 1999, Calvin College botanists David P. Warners and Daniel C. Laughlin gave evidence that they should be considered two distinct species. Compared to S. firmum, Symphyotrichum puniceum is typically hairier, with purpler flowers, and does not form dense colonies but rather small clusters or scattered individuals.

Hybrids between this species and Symphyotrichum boreale have been recorded and are called Symphyotrichum × longulum.

Conservation
, NatureServe listed Symphyotrichum puniceum as Secure (G5) worldwide and Critically Imperiled (S1) in Mississippi. It listed S. puniceum var. puniceum as Vulnerable (S3) in Kentucky, and S. puniceum var. scabricaule as overall an Imperiled Variety (T2) and Critically Imperiled (S1) in Texas.

Uses

Medicinal
Symphyotrichum puniceum has been used for medicinal purposes among indigenous people in North America. It has been documented that the Chippewa have smoked the root with tobacco to attract game. Multiple uses have been reported for the Woodland Cree, including as an aid for tooth pain and for healing a woman after childbirth. The Iroquois have used the roots for healing of various ailments including colds, fevers, pneumonia, typhoid, and tuberculosis.

Citations

References

puniceum
Flora of Canada
Flora of the United States
Plants used in traditional Native American medicine
Plants described in 1753
Taxa named by Carl Linnaeus